Patna West was an Assembly constituency in Bihar which existed till 2008. It came under Patna Lok Sabha constituency. From 2008 the seat was succeeded by Bankipur Assembly constituency. Nitin Nabin was the last MLA from this seat.

Members of Legislative Assembly

Election results

2006 Vidhan Sabha bye-election

Oct 2005 Vidhan Sabha

See also 

 Patna East Assembly constituency
 Patna Central Assembly constituency

References 

Former assembly constituencies of Bihar